On July 28, 1943 American Airlines Flight 63 was flown by a Douglas DC-3, named Flagship Ohio, routing Cleveland-Columbus-Dayton-Cincinnati-Louisville-Nashville-Memphis, that crashed on the Louisville-Nashville sector about  west of Trammel, Kentucky. The aircraft descended from  until it struck trees, then slid across an open field and stopped in an upright position. Of the 22 people on board, 20 died. The cause of the crash was loss of control due to severe turbulence and violent downdrafts.

Aircraft 
Flagship Ohio was a Douglas DC-3 manufactured by the Douglas Aircraft Company and owned and operated by American Airlines. Since its first flight in 1936, the aircraft had logged 17,991 hours of flight time. At the time of the crash, it serviced a domestic scheduled passenger route with several stops in Ohio, Kentucky, and Tennessee.

Crash 
Flight 63 departed Cleveland at approximately 5:42 pm on July 28, 1943. The flight proceeded normally during its scheduled stops in Columbus, Dayton, Cincinnati, and Louisville. The aircraft arrived at its fourth stop, Louisville, at 9:42 pm. After refueling, the flight received clearance to depart at 9:54 pm. During the Louisville-Nashville leg, the Flagship Ohio was crewed by four American Airlines personnel, and carried eighteen passengers.

The projected arrival time was 10:54 pm — an hour's flight.

Thunderstorms around Smiths Grove caused extreme turbulence and strong downdrafts which forced the plane to lose altitude.

The Civil Aeronautics Board investigated the crash and determined that the extreme turbulence and conditions caused by the nearby thunderstorm created such severe flying conditions that the pilot was unable to maintain control of the aircraft.

All four crewmembers died in the crash. Of the eighteen passengers, only two survived.

After the loss of the Flagship Ohio, American Airlines replaced the aircraft on the Cleveland-Columbus-Dayton-Cincinnati-Louisville-Nashville-Memphis route with sister DC-3 Flagship Missouri. Three months later, on October 15, 1943, Flagship Missouri crashed on the Nashville-Memphis leg of the flight.

See also 
 American Airlines
 American Airlines Flight 63 (Flagship Missouri)
 American Airlines accidents and incidents
 List of accidents and incidents involving commercial aircraft

References

External links
 Report of the Civil Aeronautics Board (PDF)

63
Airliner accidents and incidents in Kentucky
Accidents and incidents involving the Douglas DC-3
Allen County, Kentucky
1943 in Kentucky
Airliner accidents and incidents caused by microbursts
1943 meteorology
Aviation accidents and incidents in the United States in 1943